Mangalam may refer to:

 Mangalam, Tirur, a village in Kerala
 Mangalam, Tiruppur, a town in Tamil Nadu
Mother Mangalam, the co-founder and life chairman of Pure Life Society 
 Mangalam Publications, an Indian publishing company in Kottayam, Kerala, India
 Mangalam Weekly, Malayalam-language weekly magazine published by Mangalam Publications